Michael John Denton (born 25 August 1943) is a British-Australian proponent of intelligent design and a Senior Fellow at the Discovery Institute's Center for Science and Culture. He holds a PhD degree in biochemistry. Denton's book, Evolution: A Theory in Crisis, inspired intelligent design proponents Phillip Johnson and Michael Behe.

Biography
Denton gained a medical degree from Bristol University in 1969 and a PhD in biochemistry from King's College London in 1974. He was a senior research fellow in the Biochemistry Department at the University of Otago, Dunedin, New Zealand from 1990 to 2005. He later became a scientific researcher in the field of genetic eye diseases. He has spoken worldwide on genetics, evolution and the anthropic argument for design. Denton's current interests include defending the "anti-Darwinian evolutionary position" and the design hypothesis formulated in his book Nature’s Destiny. Denton described himself as an agnostic. He is currently a senior fellow at the Discovery Institute's Center for Science and Culture.

Books

Evolution: A Theory in Crisis

In 1985 Denton wrote the book Evolution: A Theory in Crisis, presenting a systematic critique of neo-Darwinism ranging from paleontology, fossils, homology, molecular biology, genetics and biochemistry, and argued that evidence of design exists in nature. Some book reviews criticized his arguments. He describes himself as an evolutionist and he has rejected biblical creationism. The book influenced both Phillip E. Johnson, the father of intelligent design, Michael Behe, a proponent of irreducible complexity, and George Gilder, co-founder of the Discovery Institute, the hub of the intelligent design movement.  Since writing the book Denton has changed many of his views on evolution; however, he still believes that the existence of life is a matter of design.

Nature's Destiny
Denton still accepts design and embraces a non-Darwinian evolutionary theory. He denies that randomness accounts for the biology of organisms; he has proposed an evolutionary theory which is a "directed evolution" in his book Nature's Destiny (1998).  Life, according to Denton, did not exist until the initial conditions of the universe were fine-tuned (see Fine-tuned universe). Denton was influenced by Lawrence Joseph Henderson (1878-1942), Paul Davies and John D. Barrow who argued for an anthropic principle in the cosmos (Denton 1998, v, Denton 2005). His second book Nature's Destiny (1998) is his biological contribution to the anthropic principle debate, dominated by physicists. He argues for a law-like evolutionary unfolding of life.

Publications
 Evolution: A Theory in Crisis. Adler & Adler, 1985. 
 Nature's Destiny: How the Laws of Biology Reveal Purpose in the Universe, New York: Free Press, 1998. 
 Evolution: Still a Theory in Crisis. Seattle, Washington: Discovery Institute, 2016. Paperback:

References

External links

 Are We Spiritual Machines? Ray Kurzweil Vs. the Critics of Strong A.I. with an essay by Michael Denton
 Denton's Genetic-Medicine Work at University of Sindh

1943 births
Living people
Alumni of King's College London
Intelligent design advocates
Non-Darwinian evolution
Pseudoscientific biologists